Malte-Brun may refer to:
 Conrad Malte-Brun (1755-1826), Danish-French geographer and journalist
 Victor Adolphe Malte-Brun (1816-1889), French geographer and cartographer and son of Conrad
 Malte Brun (mountain), a New Zealand mountain named after Victor Adolphe Malte-Brun